This is a list of all the yachts built by Royal Huisman, sorted by year.

1965-1974

1975-1984

1985-1994

1995-2004

2005-2014

2015-present

Under construction

Concept

See also
 List of large sailing yachts
 Luxury yacht
 Sailing yacht

References

Royal Huisman
Built by Royal Huisman
Royal Huisman
Lists of sailing ships